Jone Daunivucu (born 1 June 1977 in Lautoka) is a Fijian rugby union player.

Career
He is a former captain of the Fiji national sevens team. His knowledge of the game and discipline on-field allowed coach Waisale Serevi to give him the captaincy for the 2005-06 IRB World series. During his captaincy he led Fiji to victory in the 2005 Sevens Rugby World Cup and the 2005/06 World Sevens Series.

He is a utility back and plays at his usual scrum-half position and can play as a centre or on the wing. He plays for Grenoble in the French Pro D2.

External links
 Grenoble profile 
 
 

Fijian rugby union players
1977 births
Living people
Rugby union wings
Rugby union scrum-halves
Fiji international rugby union players
Fijian expatriate rugby union players
Expatriate rugby union players in France
FC Grenoble players
Fijian expatriate sportspeople in France
Fiji international rugby sevens players
Male rugby sevens players
Sportspeople from Lautoka
I-Taukei Fijian people
Commonwealth Games medallists in rugby sevens
Commonwealth Games bronze medallists for Fiji
Commonwealth Games rugby sevens players of Fiji
Rugby sevens players at the 2006 Commonwealth Games
Medallists at the 2006 Commonwealth Games